Whatever is the debut solo album by the English double bassist Danny Thompson. It was released by Rykomusic in 1987.

Reception
AllMusic awarded the album with 3.5 stars and its review by Steve Leggett states: "Highlights include the atmospheric "Till Minnie Av Jan", the very Pentangle-like "Swedish Dance," and "Lament for Alex". The Penguin Guide awarded the album with 4 stars and its review describes the album as: "One of the most intriguing group debuts in British music of the 1980s".

Track listing
All compositions by Danny Thompson, Tony Roberts and Bernie Holland except where noted.

 "Idle Monday" – 4:08
 "Till Minnie Av Jan" – 4:50
 "Yucateca" – 5:14
 "Lovely Joan" (Traditional) – 6:34
 "Swedish Dance" (Traditional) – 5:44
 "Lament for Alex" (for Alex Campbell) – 4:42
 "Crusader" – 5:26
 "Minor Escapade" – 5:13

Musicians
Danny Thompson: double bass
Tony Roberts: tenor, alto and soprano saxophones, Northumbrian pipes, clarinet, flute, sopranina, whistle 
Bernie Holland: guitars, B-H tone harp

References

External links
 

1987 albums
Rykodisc albums
Danny Thompson albums
Folk jazz albums